Bhutan competed at the 2020 Summer Paralympics in Tokyo, Japan, from 24 August to 5 September 2021. This was the country's debut appearance at the Paralympics.

Competitors

Archery

Bhutan qualified one athlete for Archery event.

|-
|align=left| Pema Rigsel
|align=left rowspan=1|Men's individual recurve
|523
|30
|align="center" |L 2-6
|colspan=5|did not advance
|}

Athletics

Bhutan is scheduled to compete in athletics. Bhutan was granted two berths through the Bipartite Commission invitation allocation on 5 May 2021.

See also
Bhutan at the 2020 Summer Olympics

References

Nations at the 2020 Summer Paralympics
2021 in Bhutanese sport
2020